Feeling is a conscious subjective experience of emotion.

The Feeling or Feeling may also refer to:
"The Feeling", an English rock band
"The Feeling", a song by DJ Fresh from the album Nextlevelism
"The Feeling", a song by Kutless from the album To Know That You're Alive
"The Feeling", a song by Justin Bieber from his album Purpose
"The Feeling", a song by Joe Satriani from the album Flying in a Blue Dream
"Feeling" (Ladipoe and Buju song), a 2021 song by Ladipoe and Buju
"Feeling" (Yōko Oginome and Masatoshi Ono song), a 1999 song by Yōko Oginome and Masatoshi Ono